Sonal Kaushal is an Indian voice actress, well known for her work in Doraemon in India, voicing the lead role, Doraemon.

She is more commonly known as The Motor Mouth, because she voices a number of characters in cartoons. She also voice Budhdev in Bandbudh Aur Budbak, Babli in Little Singham and many more.

She was also the Hindi dubbing voice of Christina Materson as Emma Goodall (the Megaforce/Super Megaforce Pink Ranger) in Power Rangers Megaforce and Power Rangers Super Megaforce. She also voiced Gina in Malibu Rescue, Malibu Rescue: The Next Wave, and the Malibu Rescue TV series.

Career
Kaushal's dubbing career started at the age of 8. It is unknown what she voiced at that time. Her first known role was of Doraemon in 2005. She became a fan-favourite as everyone loved her voice. She was replaced by Sumridhi Shukla in 2020 starting from the 17th Season. Starting from Season 18, Everyone else except Parul Bhatnagar was replaced. She also started her YouTube channel TheMotorMouth, where she voiced different other characters and also interviewed other voice-actors.

Filmography

Animated series

Bollywood films

Dubbing Roles

Live-action series

Animated series

Animated films

Live action films

Hollywood films

South Indian films

References

Indian voice actresses
Living people
Place of birth missing (living people)
1991 births